Gloria Coleman (died February 18, 2010) was an American musician.

Coleman played bass, piano then organ. As a jazz organist she released two albums. The first, Soul Sisters by the Gloria Coleman Quartet, was for the Impulse! Records label. It featured drummer Pola Roberts, Leo Wright and Grant Green.   It was produced by Bob Thiele. The second album featured Ray Copeland, Dick Griffith, James Anderson, Earl Dunbar and Charlie Davis.

Coleman wrote many songs for Bobbi Humphrey and Ernestine Anderson, among others.

Coleman married saxophonist George Coleman. The couple had two children and divorced. She died on February 18, 2010.

Discography

As leader
Soul Sisters (Impulse!, 1963) with Pola Roberts
Sings And Swings Organ (Mainstream, 1965)
Sweet Missy (Doodlin', 2007)

As sidewoman
With Leo Wright
Soul Talk (Vortex, 1963 [rel. 1970])
With Hank Crawford
Groove Master (Milestone, 1990)
With Nat Simpkins
Cookin' with Some Barbecue (Muse, 1994)

References

External links
Full Biography

Musicians from New York City
American jazz organists
Women organists
2010 deaths
Year of birth missing
Jazz musicians from New York (state)